Bukeyeva Khadisha Bukeyevna (Bökeeva Hadişa; 21 February 1917, Kaztalovka, West Kazakhstan Region - January 31, 2011, Almaty) was a Soviet, Kazakh theater and film actress, master of fine arts (reader). People's Artist of the USSR (1964).

Biography 
Khadisha Bukeyeva was born on February 21 (January 1 according to other sources)) 1917 in the village of Kaztalovka (now in the West Kazakhstan region of Kazakhstan) (according to other sources - in Kaztalovsky district).

She lost her parents at an early age and was brought up in an orphanage in the village of Chiili in South Kazakhstan Region. In 1932 she was brought to Almaty and arranged to study in a preparatory group of the Medical Institute. It was very difficult to study, the necessary knowledge the girl did not have. She had to study intermittently, so she never managed to finish school.

Passion for singing and dancing does not pass without a trace. She took part in amateur performances. In 1934 she was selected by the commission and sent to study at the Technical School of Stage Art in Leningrad (since 1936 - the Central Stage School, now the Russian State Institute of Performing Arts), from which she graduated in 1938. Her mentors were prominent masters of stage , Vsevolod Meyerhold, Vasili Merkuryev.

The process of mastering the image has always been for her difficult and painful. It stayed with her all her life, just as it did in her early years of study. It was difficult to work with her, but V. Merkuryev and I. Meyerhold believed in her strength and persistently chose the keys to the disclosure of her personality. They had early discerned remarkable dramatic temperament and consistently freeing him from the binding constraints of stiffness and clamp.

In 1938, all the graduates of the school were sent to Shymkent. They were the core of the then organized South Kazakhstan regional drama theater.

Since 1942 she was an actress in the Kazakh State Drama Auezov Theater (Almaty), where she was on stage till the end of her life.

One of the facets of her talent was the skill of artistic reading.

Since 1965 conducted pedagogical activity at the theatrical faculty (since 1977 - the Theatrical and Art Institute, nowadays the Kazakh National Academy of Arts) at the Kazakh National Conservatory (1968 - the Kazakh National Academy of Arts). She was the
student of the Kazakh National Academy of Arts named after Kurmangazy (since 1968 she was the senior lecturer, since 1974 she was the professor). Among her students are well-known Kazakh actors A. Kenzheev, K. Tastanbekov, D. Zholzhaksynov, T. Zhamankulov, M. Utekesheva, R. Mashurova.

Member of the Union of Cinematographers of the Kazakh SSR

She died on January 31, 2011, in Almaty.Buried in the Kensai cemetery.

Awards and titles 
 People's Artist of the Kazakh SSR (1957)
 People's Artist of the USSR (1964)
 Stalin Prize of the third degree (1952) for her performance as Aigerim in M. O. Auezov's play Abai
 Order of Lenin (1959)
 Order of Friendship of Peoples (1987)
 Order of the Badge of Honour (1946)
 Order of Otan (2000)
 Medal "Veteran of Labour"	
 Jubilee Medal "Forty Years of Victory in the Great Patriotic War 1941–1945"

Creative

Roles in theater

Chimkent Regional Kazakh Drama Theater named after Zh. Shanin 
 «Intrigue and Love» Friedrich Schiller by — Louise
 «Late Love» by A. Ostrovsky — Lyudmila
 «Enlik-Kebek» by Mukhtar Auezov — Enlik
 «Akhan Sera - Aktokt» Gabit Musirepov — Aktokty
 «The Eve» Alexander Afinogenov — Zhamal (staged at the Mossovet Theatre, which was evacuated to Chimkent during the war)

Auezov Theater 
 
 «Friendship and Love» by A. Abishev — Saule 
 «Kara Kipchak Koblandy» M. Auezov's — Karlyga 
 «Abai» M. Auezov — Aigerim
 «Legend of Love» (Farhad and Shirin) Nâzım Hikmet — Mekhmene Banu 
 «The Taming of the Shrew» by William Shakespeare — Katharina
 «Richard III (play)» William Shakespeare — Queen Margaret
 «Othello» by William Shakespeare — Emilia, Desdemona 
 «Saule» by T. Akhtanov — Saule
 «The Star of Vietnam» by I. Kupriyanov — Thanh
 «Amangeldy» by Gabit Musirepov — Banu
 «Kozy Korpesh - Bayan Sulu» by Gabit Musirepov — Dametken
 «Chokan Valikhanov» Sabit Mukanov — Panayeva
 «Thunderstorm» Alexander Ostrovsky — Katerina
 «Love at Dawn» Y. Galana — Varvara

Filmography 
 1940 — Raihan — Raihan
 1956 — The Birches in the Stepp — Dina
 1957 — Our Dear Doctor — Cameo
 1958 — Flurry — Rabiga
 1959 — On a Wild Shore — Muratova
 1964 — Tracks Go Beyond the Horizon — Mother

Interesting Facts 
"Born to be beautiful." "The date of her birth in her passport is January 1, 1917. But those who knew Khadisha Bukeyeva intimately claim that she did not live to her 100th birthday for only a year. And January 1 is a symbolic date in her documents. It's no secret that many of that generation, whose childhood and youth fell on the hungry 20s, the true day and even year of birth was unknown. The actress herself celebrated her birthday on February 21 - in honor of the beginning of her married life in her long and happy marriage to the opera singer Baigali Dosymzhanov." Galiya SHIMYRBAEVA, Kazakhstan truth, February 2, 2011.

Memory 
A museum was opened in the homeland of the actress, and the main street bears her name Since 2014, the name of the actress has been given to the Urals Kazakh Drama Theatre.. In Almaty, a memorial plaque has been installed on the wall of house #96 on Zenkova Street, where the actress lived for more than 25 years.

External links 
 Bukeyeva Khadisha // Great Soviet Encyclopedia: [in 30 volumes] / ed. by Alexander Prokhorov. - 3rd ed. - M. : Soviet Historical Encyclopedia, 1969-1978.
 People's Artists of the USSR
 Actresses of Kazakhstan
 People's Artists of the Kazakh SSR
 Actresses by alphabetical order
Kazakhstani actresses
People's Artists of the USSR
Kazakhstani film actresses
20th-century Kazakhstani actresses

References